Friedrich Franz, Hereditary Grand Duke of Mecklenburg-Schwerin (22 April 1910 – 31 July 2001) was the heir apparent to the throne of Mecklenburg-Schwerin and a member of the Waffen-SS.

Early life

He was born in Schwerin, the eldest child of the reigning Grand Duke of Mecklenburg-Schwerin, Frederick Francis IV, and his wife Princess Alexandra of Hanover, a daughter of Crown Prince Ernest Augustus of Hanover (a first-cousin once removed of Queen Victoria) and Princess Thyra of Denmark, the youngest daughter of King Christian IX of Denmark. Following the defeat of the German Empire in World War I, his father abdicated on 14 November 1918. He did not succeed to the throne, as the Grand Duchy was replaced with the Free State of Mecklenburg-Schwerin.

Upon the promulgation of the Weimar Constitution on 11 August 1919, altogether then abolished were titles of sovereigns, such as emperor/empress, king/queen, grand duke/grand duchess, etc. However, former titles shared and inherited by all members of the family were retained but incorporated into the surname. He therefore became known as Friedrich Franz Herzog von Mecklenburg-Schwerin (or Friedrich Franz, The Duke of Mecklenburg-Schwerin) de facto since the establishment of the Free State of Mecklenburg-Schwerin.

Post monarchy
In May 1931 against the will of his father, Friedrich Franz joined the SS and by 1936 he had been promoted to the rank of Hauptsturmführer (Captain).

He was posted to Denmark during World War II where he worked at the German embassy as a personal aide to Werner Best. He spent the summer months of 1944 serving with the Waffen-SS tank corps.

In May 1943, a family council was called by the Grand Ducal family and Friedrich Franz was passed over as heir in favour of his younger brother Duke Christian Louis, who would instead inherit the family property.

Friedrich Franz married Karin Elisabeth von Schaper (1920–2012), the daughter of Walter von Schaper and his wife Baroness Louise von Münchhausen, on 11 June 1941 at Schloß Wiligrad, near the Lake Schwerin. They divorced on 22 September 1967, but remarried a decade later in Glücksburg on 27 April 1977.

Ancestry

Notes

Sources

1910 births
2001 deaths
SS-Sturmbannführer
Hereditary Grand Dukes of Mecklenburg-Schwerin
People from Schwerin
Heirs apparent who never acceded
Waffen-SS personnel
Military personnel from Mecklenburg-Western Pomerania
Sons of monarchs